Max Walter (January 30, 1905 – December 30, 1987) was a German weightlifter who competed in the 1936 Summer Olympics. He was born in Metz, France and died in Duisburg. In 1936 he finished eighth in the featherweight class.

References
 

1905 births
1987 deaths
Sportspeople from Metz
German male weightlifters
Olympic weightlifters of Germany
Weightlifters at the 1936 Summer Olympics
World record setters in weightlifting
Sportspeople from Saarbrücken